Ben Ellwood and Mark Philippoussis defeated Vladimír Pláteník and Ricardo Schlachter in the final, 6–2, 6–4 to win the boys' doubles tennis title at the 1994 Wimbledon Championships.

Seeds

  Ben Ellwood /  Mark Philippoussis (champions)
  Gustavo Kuerten /  Nicolás Lapentti (semifinals)
  Alejandro Hernández /  Gerardo Venegas Escalente (second round)
  Jamie Delgado /  Roman Kukal (second round)
  Ricardo Rosas /  Carlos José Tori (second round)
  Paul Goldstein /  Scott Humphries (semifinals)
  Vladimír Pláteník /  Ricardo Schlachter (final)
  Yaoki Ishii /  Takao Suzuki (first round, withdrew)

Draw

Finals

Top half

Bottom half

References

External links

Boys' Doubles
Wimbledon Championship by year – Boys' doubles